The 1963–64 Swedish Division I season was the 20th season of Swedish Division I. Brynas IF won the league title by finishing first in the final round.

First round

Northern Group

Southern Group

Qualification round

Final round

External links
 1963–64 season

Swe
Swedish Division I seasons
1963–64 in Swedish ice hockey